Soon-Mi Chung (born 22 February 1952) is a South Korean-born Norwegian musician (viola, violin) and musical director.

Biography 
Chung is a music teacher at the Barratt Due Institute of Music and artistic director of Barratt Dues Juniororkester. She got her musical education at the Conservatory of Music in Paris, Menuhin Music Academy and San Francisco Conservatory, and debuted in Oslo in 1982.

Honors 
 1998: Oslo City Culture Award
 2007: The Lindeman Prize
 2010: Anders Jahre's Culture Award
 2012: Norsk kulturråds ærespris

Discography (in selection) 

1986: Christian Sinding: Serenade For To Fioliner Og Klaver, Opus 92 / Serenade For To Fioliner Og Klaver, Opus 56 (Norsk Kulturråds Klassikerserie)
1988: Johan Halvorsen: Norwegian Rhapsody No 1 & 2 • Norwegian Festival Overture Op. 16 • Entry Of The Boyars • Bergensiana, (Roccoco  Variations) • Andante Religioso • Wedding March • Passacaglia (Norsk Kulturråds Klassikerserie), with Bergen Philharmonic Orchestra directed by Karsten Andersen
1994: Mozart, Nordheim, Hvoslef: DuoDu (Victoria Records), with Stephan Barratt-Due

References

External links 

Academic staff of the Barratt Due Institute of Music
Norwegian violinists
Norwegian violists
Musicians from Oslo
People from Seoul
South Korean emigrants to Norway
1952 births
Living people
21st-century violinists
21st-century Norwegian women musicians
21st-century violists